James Augustine Shannon (August 9, 1904 – May 20, 1994) was an American nephrologist who served as director of National Institutes of Health (NIH) from August 1, 1955 to August 31, 1968. In 1962 he was awarded the Public Welfare Medal from the National Academy of Sciences, of which he was a member.
He was elected to the American Academy of Arts and Sciences in 1965 and the American Philosophical Society in 1967. A collection of his papers is held at the National Library of Medicine in Bethesda, Maryland.

References

External links
James Augustine Shannon biography via National Institutes of Health

1904 births
1994 deaths
American nephrologists
American medical researchers
Directors of the National Institutes of Health
Recipients of the President's Award for Distinguished Federal Civilian Service

Members of the American Philosophical Society